Dunn v. Ray, 586 U.S. ___ (2019), was a February 2019 United States Supreme Court case related to religious freedom. The case attracted media attention in early February 2019. Defendant Domineque Hakim Marcelle Ray (May 31, 1976 – February 7, 2019), an Alabama death row inmate scheduled for execution on February 7, 2019, argued that he had the right to have a Muslim imam present in the execution chamber, instead of the Christian chaplain mandated by Alabama's execution protocol. Ray received a stay from the 11th Circuit Court of Appeals the day before his execution, but Alabama moved for the Supreme Court to vacate the stay of execution. The Supreme Court vacated the stay and Ray was executed on his scheduled date. He was one of 22 people executed in the United States in 2019.

The ruling was criticized by many commentators.

On March 28, 2019, less than two months after Ray's execution, the Supreme Court stayed the execution of Patrick Murphy in Texas over concerns that not allowing him to have a Buddhist spiritual advisor instead of the Christian chaplain or Muslim imams, only two religions' spiritual advisors permitted by Texas to be present in the execution chamber, would violate his Constitutional rights. The ruling on Murphy renewed attention to Ray's case due to the similarity and proximity of the cases. and the lack of explanation from justices Alito, Kavanaugh and Roberts for their latest positions.

In June 2020, after Texas changed its policy to prohibit the presence of all spiritual advisors in execution chambers, the Supreme Court also stayed the execution of Ruben Gutierrez, a Catholic convicted murderer, and ordered consideration of his request to have a spiritual advisor present in the execution chamber at the time of his execution.

In February 2021, the Supreme Court again ruled that excluding spiritual counselors from the execution chamber was not allowed, by intervening in the execution of Willie B. Smith III, a murderer in Alabama. Writing for the court, Justice Elena Kagan said "Alabama has not carried its burden of showing that the exclusion of all clergy members from the execution chamber is necessary to ensure prison security. So the State cannot now execute Smith without his pastor present, to ease what Smith calls the 'transition between the worlds of the living and the dead'."

Similar issues arose again in September 2021 when the Supreme Court stayed the execution of John Henry Ramirez, who requested to have a minister of his choice present and allowed to lay hands on his body and audibly pray during his execution in Texas. In March 2022, the Supreme Court ruled in favor of Ramirez's request.

Background
Ray had been sentenced to death for the rape and murder of a 15-year-old girl, and had been given a life sentence for the murders of two brothers.

The State's claim was that in February 1994, Ray and an accomplice, Marcus Owden, shot and killed brothers Reinhard and Ernest Mabins, after they refused to join a gang they were attempting to organize. The State claimed that on July 15, 1995, Ray and Owden kidnapped 15-year-old Tiffany Harville from her home in Selma, Alabama. Ray raped and murdered her and cut her throat with a knife according to Owden's trial testimony. Harville's body was found abandoned in a field in Dallas County a month after she disappeared.

Owden testified against Ray and he was convicted in 1999. Owden was sentenced to life in prison, while Ray received a death sentence, when jurors voted 11–1 to recommend the death penalty.

Following his arrest in 1997, Ray initially gave statements to police in which he implicated himself in the Mabins and Harville murders. Ray later denied that he had participated in either crime and claimed his police statements were fabrications.  No physical evidence connected Ray to the crimes.  In his final post-conviction appeal, Ray attempted to call attention to the fact that Marcus Owden, Ray's co-defendant and the prosecution's primary witness, suffered from schizophrenia, hallucinations and other mental health problems, and that the State was aware of Owden's mental health problems at the time of Ray's trial but failed to disclose Owden's diagnoses to Ray's attorneys as required by Brady v. Maryland, 373 U.S. 83 (1963).  The fact that the Alabama Department of Corrections had been medicating Owden for years for his mental health problems was not revealed until many years after Ray's trial.  Ray argued, supported by experts in the fields of psychology and psychiatry, that had it been revealed at trial that Owden was seriously mentally ill at the time he testified against Ray, the jury might have had doubts about Owden's veracity and reliability and might not have convicted Ray, or at least might not have recommended the death sentence.  The Alabama Court of Criminal Appeals and the Alabama Supreme Court refused to consider Ray's final post-conviction appeal.  The U.S. Supreme Court also refused to consider Ray's final appeal.

See also
 Bucklew v. Precythe
 List of people executed in Alabama
 List of people executed in the United States in 2019

References

External links
 

2019 in United States case law
United States Supreme Court cases
United States Supreme Court cases of the Roberts Court
Islam-related controversies in North America
February 2019 events in the United States
Capital punishment in Alabama
United States death penalty case law